Anderland was a 45-part German children's mystery television series which aired for the first time on 4 March 1980 on ZDF. It starred Carlo Ianni, Dirk Zalm, Mira Gittner and Loni von Friedl.

See also
List of German television series

External links
 

German children's television series
1980 German television series debuts
1986 German television series endings
ZDF original programming
German-language television shows